Zhinanzhen (指南针乐队 The Compass) are a Chinese rock band formed in Sichuan in 1990, coming to Beijing in 1991. 
The band's original lineup was singer Luo Qi, with guitarist Zhou Di, Keyboardist Guo Liang, drummer Zheng Chaozhen, and saxophonist Yuan Ding. Luo Qi parted ways with the band, going solo then leaving China for Germany for six years.

For the album Wufa taotuo the six-man line up was singer Liu Zhēngróng, bass Yue Haokun, and the four original members: guitarist Zhou Di, Keyboardist Guo Liang, drummer Zheng Chaozhen, and saxophonist Yuan Ding.

Albums
 1993 Xuanze jianqiang 选择坚强 with Luo Qi
 1997 Wufa taotuo (无法逃脱)

References

Chinese rock music groups